Enzio d'Antonio (16 May 1925 – 17 December 2019) was an Italian Roman Catholic bishop.

D'Antonio was born in Italy and was ordained to the priesthood in 1949. He served as archbishop of the Roman Catholic Archdiocese of Campobasso-Boiano, Italy, from 1977 to 1979 and as archbishop of the Roman Catholic Archdiocese of Lanciano-Ortona, Italy, from 1982 to 2000.

Notes

1925 births
2019 deaths
Italian Roman Catholic archbishops